Nakhtmin (also called Minnakht) was a Troop Commander of Kush and Royal Envoy to Every Foreign Land during the reign of Ramesses II.

Family
Nakhtmin was the son of the Troop Commander Pennesuttawy and Maia. He was the grandson of Minhotep and Maia.  His uncles included he High Priest of Amun Parennefer who is dated to the reigns of Tutankhamen and Horemheb and the High Priest of Min and Isis named Minmose.

Monuments
 Theban Tomb TT282 A faience knob in the tomb of his son Anhernakht mentions the Troop Commander Nakhtmin.
 Graffito at Aswan shows the Fanbearer on the King's Right Hand, the Royal Envoy to every foreign country and Troop Commander Nakhtmin.
 Graffito at Bigeh mentions Nakhtmin and identifies him as the son of Pennesuttawy. The inscription is a prayer to Khnum for the Ka of Nakhtmin.
 Nakhtmin is mentioned in the tomb of his father Pennesuttawy (TT156).

References

Nineteenth Dynasty of Egypt
Kingdom of Kush